The Coccidulinae are a subfamily of lady beetles in the family Coccinellidae. Recent molecular analyses suggest that Coccidulinae is not a monophyletic group (e.g., the tribe Noviini may belong instead with Epilachninae).

Genera

References

Coccinellidae
Polyphaga subfamilies
Taxa named by Étienne Mulsant